If These Streets Could Talk is the debut album from Just Surrender. The artwork was done by haymakerprint.com. The band recorded two videos from this album, "Tell Me Everything" and "I Can Barely Breathe." This is the first CD on their label, Broken English Records. The album was produced by John Naclerio, who was already known for his work with bands such as Brand New and Senses Fail.

Release
Just Surrender toured the East Coast with Bayside and the Junior Varsity in May 2005. They went on a West Coast tour with Nural in August 2005. They followed this with an appearance at CMJ Music Marathon, and a two-month US cross-country tour with My American Heart, October Fall, and Lorene Drive. In November 2005, they toured with Days Like These and Paint by Numbers. They closed out the year with Scary Kids Scaring Kids and June on the Too Cold for School tour. They supported Paulson on their headlining US tour in January 2006. In May 2006, they performed with Boys Night Out on their US tour, and appeared at The Bamboozle festival. In August 2006, the band supported the Audition on their headlining US tour.

Track listing

Personnel
Just Surrender
Jason Maffucci – bass guitar, vocals
Dan Simons – rhythm guitar, vocals
Andrew Meunier – lead guitar, backing vocals
Steve Miller – drums

Additional musicians
Zack Roach – guitar
John Collura – piano

Production
John Naclerio – producer, mixing, mastering	 
Chris Hughes – producer
Rob Kucharek	logo design

References

External links
 Official Webpage
 

Just Surrender albums
2005 albums